The Pilot Show is a British TV comedy show written and created by Paul Garner. Commissioned by E4 and subsequently airing on Channel 4 in 2004, the show duped celebrities and members of the public into appearing on what they believed were pilots for real TV shows. Over 30,000 British men applied to be on a new reality show called 'Lapdance Island' only to discover that it was in fact a hoax for The Pilot Show.

The show featured Paul Garner, Sharon Horgan, Marc Wootton, Robin Ince, Rob Rouse and Steve Oram. It was produced by Damon Beesley and made for E4 by Ealing Studios.

The Pilot Show went on to be remade for American television. VH1 in New York commissioned a 16-part series that first aired in May 2005. The show, renamed BSTV,  was exec produced by Garner alongside Rob Moore from Ealing Studios and Jim Biederman for VH1. Garner and Marc Wootton were the only British cast members to feature in the U.S. remake.

External links
 

British comedy television shows
2004 British television series debuts
E4 comedy